Scot Severn (born July 20, 1968) is a Paralympian athlete from the United States competing mainly in F53 classification throwing events.

Athletics history
Severn first represented the United States at the 2008 Summer Paralympics in Beijing, entering the shot put and discus throw events. Four years later he experienced Paralympic success at the 2012 Games in London, where he threw a distance of 8.26 to claim the bronze medal in the shot put.

As well as his Paralympic appearances, Severn has also been part of three U.S. teams to compete at the IPC Athletics World Championships, beginning in Christchurch, New Zealand at the 2011 IPC Athletics World Championships. Severn has won two World title medals, both in the shot put and both silver, in Lyon in 2013 and Doha in 2015.

Personal history
Severn was born in Cass City, Michigan in the United States in 1968. Whilst serving as a United States Army Reserve he was struck by lightning and thrown over thirty meters. The resulting trauma left him with quadriplegia. Severn is married to his wife Brenda and has three children named Nicole, Kyle, and Colton.

Notes

1968 births
Living people
Paralympic track and field athletes of the United States
Athletes (track and field) at the 2008 Summer Paralympics
Athletes (track and field) at the 2012 Summer Paralympics
Paralympic bronze medalists for the United States
Paralympic silver medalists for the United States
Medalists at the 2012 Summer Paralympics
Medalists at the 2016 Summer Paralympics
American male shot putters
American male discus throwers
People from Tuscola County, Michigan
Track and field athletes from Michigan
Paralympic medalists in athletics (track and field)
Medalists at the 2011 Parapan American Games
Athletes (track and field) at the 2020 Summer Paralympics
United States Army reservists
Military personnel from Michigan